Children of Glory is a 2006 film directed by Krisztina Goda. Children of Glory commemorates Hungary's Revolution of 1956 and the "Blood in the Water" match. Taking place in Budapest and at the Melbourne Olympic Games in October and November of that year, the film takes viewers into the passion and sadness of one of the most dramatic popular revolts of the twentieth century. In the same year Soviet tanks were violently suppressing the Revolution within Hungary, the Hungarian water polo team was winning over Russia in the Olympic pool in Melbourne, in what is sometimes described as the bloodiest water polo match in history. While telling the story of 1956 in part through fictional lead characters, the film-makers simultaneously recreated many of the key public events of the Revolution, including the huge demonstrations and the fighting in the streets of Budapest.

Plot summary
In 1956, Karcsi Szabó (Iván Fenyő) was a star athlete at the University of Budapest and had been named captain of the national water polo team that would represent Hungary in the Olympics held that summer in Australia. However, many of Szabó's countrymen had more on their minds; Hungary had fallen under the oppressive rule of the Soviet Union, and a growing number of Hungarians were demanding independence. One day, Szabó and his friend Tibi (Sándor Csányi) witness a demonstration led by Viki Falk (Kata Dobó) demanding an end to Soviet rule in Hungary.

While initially Szabó is more attracted to Falk's beauty than her message, through his attempts to woo her he is awakened to the need for revolution; however, an uprising by the people is crushed by the Soviet war machine, and matters become worse for the Hungarian people. When Szabó and his teammates discover that Hungary will be competing against the Soviet Union in the men's Water Polo tournament at the upcoming Olympics, they see an opportunity for a symbolic victory over their oppressors, if they will be allowed to leave to country to compete.

Cast
 Kata Dobó as Falk Viki
 Iván Fenyő as Szabó Karcsi
 Sándor Csányi as Vámos Tibi
 Károly Gesztesi as Telki coach
 Ildikó Bánsági as Karcsi's mother
 Tamás Jordán as Karcsi's granddad
 Viktória Szávai as Hanák Eszter
 Zsolt Huszár as Gál Jancsi
 Tamás Keresztes as Ács Imi
 Péter Haumann as Feri bácsi
 Dániel Gábori as Józsika (as Gábori Dániel)
 Róbert Marton as Kardos Márton (Compó)
 Kornél Simon as Abonyi Gyula (Báró)
 Krisztián Kolovratnik as Fazekas Sándor (Frank)
 Antal Czapkó as Prokop

References

External links
 Official site 
 
 
 
 
 The Times Review
 American DVD version

2006 films
2000s sports films
C2 Pictures films
Films about the 1956 Summer Olympics
Films produced by Andrew G. Vajna
Films scored by Nick Glennie-Smith
Hungarian historical drama films
Hungarian Revolution of 1956 films
Films with screenplays by Joe Eszterhas
Water polo films
Films directed by Krisztina Goda